The  was a Cabinet-level ministry in the Empire of Japan. Its modern successors include the Ministry of Internal Affairs and Communications, Japan Post and Nippon Telegraph and Telephone

History

Meiji period
On December 22, 1885 the Ministry of Communications was established, combining the Bureau of Posts and Post Station Maintenance and Shipping Bureau formerly under the Ministry of Agriculture and Commerce with the Telegraph Bureau and Lighthouse Management Bureau formerly under the Ministry of Industry. On August 16, 1891, the ministry was also placed in charge of the nascent Japanese electric power industry. On July 21, 1892, the Railway Bureau was transferred to the Ministry of Communications from the Home Ministry and from November 10, 1893, the ministry was charged with the supervision of all land and water transportation businesses.

However, on December 5, 1908, the Railway Bureau was separated to become an independent bureau reporting directly to the Cabinet.

Showa period
 
In April 1923, responsibility for civil aviation supervision was transferred to the Ministry of Communications from the Army Ministry. With the creation of the Railway Ministry in May 1928, supervision of all land transportation was removed from the Ministry of Communications. With the establishment in January 1938 of the Ministry of Health and Welfare, all matters pertaining to the postal insurance program were transferred to the new ministry, with the Ministry of Communications retaining control of the post offices and managing the postal system (including the Postal savings system. In December 1941, an external Maritime Affairs Council was established and took over the Lighthouse Bureau.

On November 1, 1943 the Ministry of Communications was merged with Railway Ministry to become the Ministry of Communications and Transport. Electrical production and aircraft manufacturing regulation was transferred to the Ministry of Munitions. Posts, telephone and telegraph, post office bank and insurance came under the Communications Institute, where issues relating the transportation came under the Directorate General of Shipping.

In May 1945, the Communications Institute became the Board of Communications, reporting directly to the Cabinet, and the Ministry of Communications and Transport was renamed the Ministry of Transport.

Post-war dissolution
After the surrender of Japan, the American occupation authorities briefly reestablished the Ministry of Communications on April 1, 1946; however it was in charge of only posts, telecommunications and the security of aerial navigation.  The Ministry was formally abolished on April 1, 1949 and its responsibilities divided between the new Ministry of Postal Services and Ministry of Telecommunications.

Ministers of Communications

References

Politics of the Empire of Japan
Communications
1885 establishments in Japan
1949 disestablishments in Japan